Bodianus thoracotaeniatus is a species of wrasse. 
It is found in the Northwest Pacific Ocean.

Size

References

Fish of the Pacific Ocean
thoracotaeniatus
Taxa named by Eiichi Yamamoto
Fish described in 1982